Antonio Gentile Pallavicini (Genoa, 1441 – 1507) was an Italian Cardinal. He was considered papabile in 1492. Bishop of Frascati from April until December 1503; later bishop of Palestrina.

He was bishop of Ventimiglia from 1484; then bishop of Ourense in Spain from 1486.</ref> From 1484 to 1489 he was Papal Datary in the Roman Curia, and therefore did not reside in Ventimiglia. In 1493, the pope Alexander VI appointed him bishop of Pamplona, taking over from Cesare Borgia, against the will of the monarchs of Navarre, and finding instead the veiled support of Ferdinand II of Aragon.

There is a well-known portrait by Titian. He was buried in the Old St. Peter's Basilica but his tomb was transferred to the Montemirabile Chapel in Santa Maria del Popolo in 1596.

Antonio's nephew was the cardinal Giovanni Battista Pallavicino (1480–1524).

See also
Pallavicini
Francesco Sforza Pallavicino, cardinal of the 17th century

Notes

External links

Biography

1441 births
1507 deaths
16th-century Italian cardinals
Cardinal-bishops of Frascati
Cardinal-bishops of Palestrina
Bishops of Ourense
15th-century Italian cardinals
15th-century Italian Roman Catholic bishops